Grassie may refer to:

Grassie, Ontario, a community in the township of West Lincoln, Canada
Andrew Grassie (born 1966), Scottish artist
Chris Grassie (born 1978), English football coach
William Grassie (born 1957), an American religious studies scholar and activist